Success is a 1983 studio album originally released by American singing duo The Weather Girls. The album includes the group's biggest hit, "It's Raining Men", which peaked at #1 on the U.S. Dance chart, #46 on the U.S. Pop chart, & #34 on the U.S. R&B chart.

Track listing
"Success" (Bob Esty, Paul Jabara) - 6:10
"Hungry For Love" (Paul Jabara) - 4:57
"Dear Santa (Bring Me a Man This Christmas)" (Paul Jabara, Paul Shaffer) - 6:29
"Hope" (Bob Esty, Paul Jabara) - 4:05
"It's Raining Men" (Paul Jabara, Paul Shaffer) - 5:26
"I'm Gonna Wash That Man Right Outa My Hair" (Richard Rodgers, Oscar Hammerstein II) - 5:14

Production
Produced By Paul Jabara & Jerry Solomon
Executive Producer: Charles Koppelman
Engineers: Jerr Solomon, Randy Tominaga
Assistant Engineers: John Davenport, Peter Hefter, Nicky Kalliongis
Mixing: Randy Tominaga
Mastering: Jose Rodriguez
Photography - Francesco Scavullo

Personnel
The Weather Girls
Izora Armstead, Martha Wash - lead vocals
Additional personnel
Chris Parker, Carlos Vega, Buddy Williams - drums
Neil Jason, Leland Sklar - bass
Ray Chew, Paul Delph, Bob Esty, Greg Mathieson, Leon Pendarvis, Paul Shaffer, Ed Walsh - keyboards, synthesizer, piano
Michael Landau, Jeff Mironov, David Spinozza, Georg Wadenius - guitar
Patti Austin, Peggi Blu, Carmine and the Granito Brothers, Diva Gray, Lani Groves, Yvonne Lewis, Ullanda McCullough, Robin Clark, Stephanie Spruill, Julia Tillman Waters, Maxine Willard Waters, Deniece Williams, Zenobia - backing vocals
Vocals arranged by Paul Jabara
Rhythm arrangements: Ray Chew
Horns arranged by Ray Chew & Harold Wheeler
Strings arranged by Harold Wheeler

References

1983 albums
Columbia Records albums
The Weather Girls albums